Elvira Barbey (7 August 1892 – 18 August 1971) was a Swiss figure skater. She competed at the 1928 Winter Olympics and finished 19th in singles and 11th in pairs, together with her husband Louis Barbey. She and Louis later won the French Figure Skating Championships in 1934 and 1936. Their daughter Gaby Clericetti also became a competitive figure skater.

References

1892 births
1971 deaths
Swiss female single skaters
Swiss female pair skaters
French female pair skaters
Olympic figure skaters of Switzerland
Figure skaters at the 1928 Winter Olympics